The Vantawng Khawhthla  is located  south of Thenzawl in Serchhip district in the Indian state of Mizoram. It is one of the highest waterfall in Mizoram.

The falls
Vantawng Khawhthla or Vantawng Falls is the  highest and most spectacular of the waterfalls and cascades in the fast flowing rivers of Mizoram. It is located in Vanva river near Thenzawl and is named after Vantawnga, who was said to be an excellent swimmer. So good a swimmer was Vantawnga that he could hover in the cascading water like a fish, but unfortunately, during one of such performances, a drifting log fell from above and killed him.

Though it is difficult to get close to it because of the sheer forested hillsides surrounding it, a viewing tower has been constructed.

See also
List of waterfalls in India
List of waterfalls in India by height
Tourism in Mizoram

References 

Tourist attractions in Mizoram
Waterfalls of Mizoram